Stacey Lauren Nelson (born April 12, 1987) is an American, former collegiate All-American, retired right-handed softball pitcher, originally from Los Alamitos, California. She played for the Florida Gators softball team from 2006-2009, leading the University of Florida to its first Women's College World Series berth in 2008 and a national runner-up appearance in the 2009 Women's College World Series. Nelson was also the 13th pick in the 2009 National Pro Fastpitch's draft by the defunct Washington Glory.
Nelson pitched for the United States women's national softball team in 2009 and 2010 before attending law school at Loyola Law School in Los Angeles. She is the Florida career record holder wins, ERA, shutouts and innings pitched. She also ranks all-time in several career categories in the Southeastern Conference and the NCAA Division I.

Early Years
Nelson was born in  Los Angeles County, California and raised in Los Alamitos, California.  She attended Los Alamitos High School, and was coached during her high school softball career by Jim Dolan. She set school records for career shutouts and single season strikeouts, while her high school won the Sunset League title all four years of her career. Her team were 2003 California Interscholastic Federation (CIF) Quarterfinalists and 2004 CIF Runners-up. She was named the team's Most Valuable Player in 2004 & 2005. Nelson was named to the All-Sunset League and All-County team twice and named 2005 Sunset League Pitcher of the Year and Los Alamitos High School's Female Athlete of the Year.

Florida Gators
Nelson began her career being put on the Southeastern Conference Freshman Team and setting a school  record in season saves. In her sophomore year, Nelson was named to the second team for both the Southeastern Conference and the NFCA. She broke the school records for season wins, strikeouts and innings pitched, all remain top-5 marks; her ERA, shutouts and opponents batting average were and continue to be top-10 all-time. The wins are also 10th best for the conference.

As a junior, Nelson made the NFCA First Team and was awarded Southeastern Conference Pitcher of The Year. Earning a conference pitching Triple Crown, she also broke her own season records in wins (led NCAA and set the Junior Class record), strikeouts and innings, while her ERA also improved to the top of the school list. Her opponents average, shutouts and strikeout ratio still rank top-10. In the conference her wins, ERA and innings also remain top-10.

On February 27, Nelson tied and set a school and career single game record fanning 16 batters vs. the Long Beach State 49ers. Winning pitcher Brooke Turner matched the total for 32 combined strikeouts, a top-10 NCAA record. Beginning on March 13, with an 8-4 victory over the Alabama Crimson Tide, the Gator went on a 26 consecutive game win streak, snapped by the UCF Knights on May 18. Leading her team to a No. 1 seed, the Gators reached the Women's College World Series and responded to an opening loss with three wins to get to the semifinals where they were eventually eliminated by the Texas A&M Aggies on June 2. Nelson was named to the WCWS All-Tournament Team.

For a final time Nelson was a NFCA First Team honoree and Southeastern Conference Pitcher of The Year. With a second conference Triple Crown and two no-hitters in tow, she set new school records in season ERA (tops in the NCAA), WHIP and shutouts, which helped her to the all-time season Triple Crown for the school. Her wins, strikeouts, innings, strikeout ratio (career best 8.7) and opponents average are top-5 records. The ERA and wins rank fifth for a Southeastern Conference season.

In a February 20 win against the Arizona State Sun Devils, Nelson collected her 100th victory. On April 4-May 3, Nelson achieved a career best 51.1 consecutive scoreless inning streak. She was 11-0 over 12 games (6 complete), whiffing 66 and surrendering 24 hits and 8 walks for a 0.62 WHIP. Later during that streak on April 26 and for one of her no-hitters, she also garnered the 1000th strikeout of her career, defeating the Arkansas Razorbacks. To reach that year's WCWS, she bested the Texas A&M Aggies on May 16 with a 14 strikeout performance in regulation for a career high. Repeating their previous tournament seeding, the team went undefeated in getting to the finals and Nelson pitched two shutouts before suffering back-to-back losses to eventual champions the Washington Huskies, concluding on June 2. She was again named All-Tournament for her efforts.

Nelson would graduate with and maintains the Florida career crown in wins, ERA, shutouts and innings pitched; her strikeouts, opponents average and strikeout ratio are currently top-5 all-time. Additionally, she ranks top-5 in all but the three latter categories for her school's conference. In the NCAA, her wins tie her at sixth place along with several season records.

Awards and honors
2007 - SEC Academic Honor Roll
2007 - NFCA All-Southeast Region
2007 - NFCA/Louisville Slugger All-American second team
2007 - Easton All-American Pitcher
2008 - SEC First Team
2008 - SEC Academic Honor Roll
2008 - SEC Tournament MVP
2008 - NFCA All-Southeast Region
2008 - NFCA/Louisville Slugger All-American first team
2008 - SEC Player of the Year
2008 - ESPN The Magazine Academic First-Team All-American
2008 - Easton All-American Pitcher
2009 - Top three-finalist for the 2009 USA Softball Collegiate Player of the Year
2009 - SEC First-Team
2009 - SEC Academic Honor Roll
2009 - NFCA/Louisville Slugger All-American first team
2009 - ESPN The Magazine Academic All-American of the Year
2009 - SEC Pitcher of the Year
2009 - Lowe's Senior CLASS Award
2014 - All-Brazilian Joao Pedro Tournament Champion

Law School
Nelson attended Loyola Law School from 2011-2014. She currently works at the Inspector General's Office in Los Angeles, CA.  Nelson filed a lawsuit against her employer at the Inspector General's Office alleging unfair employment practices.  Nelson lost her lawsuit.

Philanthropy
Her interest in child soldiers has grown into a project in northern Uganda. With the goal of creating jobs for those affected by the LRA War, Nelson is working to open a bread factory in Pader, Uganda.

Career Statistics

University of Florida

References

External links
 
Independent Alligator interviews Nelson
Sports Pundits discusses Stacey Nelson
Gainesville Sun talks about Nelson's performance
Nelson wins Ben Hill Griffin Award
ESPN's Graham Hays profiles Stacey Nelson -  Nelson carries stellar arm and a smile February 11, 2009
Stacey Nelson Softball 2009 Lowe's Senior CLASS Award
Sport's Illustrated On Campus Q&A Stacey Nelson May 30, 2008

1987 births
Living people
Florida Gators softball players
Loyola Law School alumni
People from Los Alamitos, California
Sportspeople from Los Angeles County, California
Sportspeople from Orange County, California
Softball players from California